Lifeline is Phillips, Craig and Dean's second album. Two singles, "Concert of the Age" and "I Want to Be Just Like You", were released to Christian radio. Both songs, along with "He'll Do Whatever It Takes" and "Build a Bridge of Love", were included on Favorite Songs of All. In addition, "Concert of the Age" was included in WOW 1996.

Track listing

Personnel 

Phillips, Craig and Dean
 Randy Phillips – lead vocals (tracks 1, 6, 8), backing vocals
 Shawn Craig – lead vocals (tracks 1, 4, 7, 9), backing vocals
 Dan Dean – lead vocals (tracks 1, 2, 3, 5, 10), backing vocals

Musicians
 Brian Green – keyboards, programming, strings
 Paul Mills – additional keyboards and programming
 Phil Madeira – Hammond B3 organ
 Mark Baldwin – guitars
 Jerry McPherson – guitars
 Jimmie Lee Sloas – bass guitar
 Mark Hammond – drums, percussion, drum programming
 Carl Marsh – horns (track 1)
 Bobby Taylor – English horn (track 3)
 Sam Levine – saxophones (track 6)
 Mark Douthit – saxophone overdubs (track 7)
 Chris McDonald – trombone and brass arrangements (track 6)
 Barry Green – trombone (track 6)
 Mike Haynes – trumpet (track 6)
 Additional background vocals – Lisa Bevill, Guy Penrod, Chris Rodriguez, Michael Black, Michael Mellett, and Tom McCain
 Choir (track 6) – The Music City Mass Choir
 Children choir (track 8) – Kid Connection Music
 Janet McMahon-Wilson – choir contractor (track 8)

Production 
 Produced by Paul Mills
 Co-produced by Brian Green
 Executive Producer – Jackie Patillo
 Engineers – Lynn Fuston, Steve Dady, and Paul Mills.
 Assistant Engineers – Dave Dillbeck and Todd Robbins
 Recorded at RTC Studio, Castlebury Productions, The Saltmine and North Beach Studio (Franklin, TN); OmniSound Studios (Nashville, TN).
 Mixed by Lynn Fuston at North Beach Studio.
 Mastered by Hank Williams at MasterMix (Nashville, TN).
 Production Coordination – Chad Williams and Scott Brickell at Chapel Hill Management.
 Art Direction and Design – Brian Dominey
 Creative Direction – Toni Thigpen
 Photography – Russ Harrington
 A&R – Vicki Dvoracek

References

1994 albums
Phillips, Craig and Dean albums